The Bangladeshi Cinema, better known as Dhallywood, is the Bengali-language film industry based in Dhaka, Bangladesh. It has often been a significant film industry since the early 1970s. The dominant style of Bangladeshi cinema is melodramatic cinema, which developed from 1947 to 1990 and characterizes most films to this day. Cinema was introduced in Bangladesh in 1898 by the Bradford Bioscope Company, credited to have arranged the first film release in Bangladesh. Between 1913 and 1914, the first production company, Picture House, was opened. A 1928 short silent film titled Sukumari was the first Bengali-produced film in the region. The first full-length film, The Last Kiss, was released in 1931.

Following the separation of Bangladesh from Pakistan, Dhaka became the center of the Bangladeshi film industry, and has generated the majority share of revenue, production and audiences for Dhallywood films. Mukh O Mukhosh, the first Bengali-language full-length feature film, was produced in 1956. During the 1970s, many Dhallywood films were inspired by Indian films, with some of the films being unofficial remakes of those films. The industry continued to grow, and many successful Bangladeshi films were produced throughout the 1970s, 1980s and the first half of the 1990s.

Directors such as Fateh Lohani, Zahir Raihan, Alamgir Kabir, Khan Ataur Rahman, Subhash Dutta, Ehtesham, Chashi Nazrul Islam, Kazi Hayat, Sheikh Niamat Ali, Tauquir Ahmed, Tanvir Mokammel, Tareque Masud, Morshedul Islam, Humayun Ahmed, Rubaiyat Hossain, Mostofa Sarwar Farooki, Abul Bashar Sohel, and others have made significant contributions to Bangladeshi mainstream cinema, parallel cinema, and art films. Some have also won global acclaim.

History

Origin 

On 28 December 1895, the Lumière brothers began commercial bioscope shows in Paris, with the first bioscope shows of the Indian subcontinent occurring the following year, including one in Calcutta and another at the Crown Theatre in Dhaka. The Bradford Bioscope Company of Calcutta arranged the show, which featured very short news items and other short features including footage of the jubilee of Queen Victoria, battles between Greek and Turkish forces, and the French underground railway. The price of a ticket to the show was an expensive eight anas to three taka. Bioscope shows continued to be shown throughout the region, including in Bhola, Manikganj, Gazipur, Rajbari, and Faridpur. These became the first films ever to be released in Bangladesh.

The first seeds of Bengali cinema were sown by Hiralal Sen, a native of Bogjuri who is considered a stalwart of Victorian era cinema. Sen founded a company named The Royal Bioscope Company in 1898, producing scenes from the stage productions of a number of popular shows at the Star Theater, Minerva Theater, and Classic Theater in Kolkata. He pioneered film-making in the Calcutta in 1901, and shot footage in his home region. This was the first filming of what is now the nation of Bangladesh.

At the time when Calcutta-based film production houses were forming, East Bengal cinema halls were showing films produced in Calcutta, Bombay, Madras, Hollywood, and Paris. Sequential bioscope shows were started in Dhaka in 1913–14 in a jute store. It was named Picture House, becoming the first theater to be built in present-day Bangladesh.

Silent era 
The Madan Theatre started making films in Calcutta in 1916. The first Bengali feature film, Billwamangal, was produced and released in 1919 under the banner of the Madan Theatre. The movie was directed by Rustomji Dhotiwala and produced by Priyonath Ganguli, the son of a nawab estate of Dhaka. A Bengali film organization named the Indo British Film Co was soon formed in Calcutta under the ownership of Dhirendra Nath Ganguly, a relative of Rabindranath Tagore. Ganguly directed and wrote Bilat Ferat in 1921. The film was the first production of the Indo British Film Co. The Madan Theatre production of Jamai Shashthi(1931) was the first Bengali talkie directed by Amar Choudhury.

In 1927–28, the Dhaka nawab family produced a short film named Sukumari (The Good Girl). The film's producers included Khaza Adil, Khaza Akmol, Khaza Nasirulla, Khaza Azmol, Khaza Zohir, Khaza Azad, Soyod Shahebe Alom, and professor Andalib Shadini. They wanted to make a film with their own actors and without the help of a studio. The male lead was played by Khaza Nosrulla, and the female lead was played by a male actor named Syed Abdus Sobhan owing to laws against the depiction of women in film. Nosrulla went on to become a politician and Sobhan became the first Bengali secretary of the Pakistan Central Civil Service. One still picture of Sukumary is kept in Bangladesh Film Archive.

After the success of Sukumari, the royal family went for a bigger venture. To make a full-length silent film, a temporary studio was made in the gardens of the family, and they produced a full-length silent film titled The Last Kiss, released in 1931. The main actor was Khaza Azmol. The physical teacher of Jagannath College, Ambujgupta, directed the film and made the Bengali and English subtitles for it. Professor Andalib Shadani of the Dhaka University made the Urdu subtitles. The Last Kiss was released in the Mukul Hall of Dhaka. Historian Dr. Romesh Chondro Mojumder started the premier show of the film. The print of the film was taken to the Aurora Company of Calcutta for bigger presentation. The developers of the film wanted to make Dhaka unique in art, literature and cinema and named their production house “Dhaka East Bengal Cinematograph Society”. It was the first film-producing organization of Bangladesh.

Early development

Pakistan era 

By 1947, there were around 80 cinemas in Bangladesh.After the partition of India in 1947, there were efforts to turn Dhaka into East Bengal's cultural center, with various individuals like Abbasuddin Ahmed creating short-lived film production companies in the city. In March 1948, when the Governor-General of Pakistan Mohammad Ali Jinnah came to visit East Pakistan, the radio broadcaster and filmmaker Nazir Ahmed was commissioned to create the informational film In Our Midst  with the help of Calcutta-based film technicians. It was the first informational film of Bangladesh.

1950s 
Two years after the creation of the Bengali Language Movement in 1952, the film-making company Co-operative Film Makers, Ltd. was formed in Dhaka under the leadership of Shohidul Alam, Abdul Jabbar Khan, and Kazi Nuruzzaman. The company produced Salamot (1954) under the direction of Nazir Ahmed. The film was commercially successful and allowed the company to grow. In 1955, during the rule of the United Front, Chief Secretary N.M. Khan created a film studio and laboratory in Dhaka's Tejgaon Thana. The first full-length feature film with sound made in East Pakistan was The Face and the Mask, which was directed by Abdul Jabbar Khan and released on 3 August 1956. Editing, printing and all other film processing for this movie were done in Lahore, Pakistan. Abdul Jabbar directed and starred in the film, which also starred Inam Ahmed, Purnima Sen, and Nazma.

"The East Pakistan Film Development Corporation Bill, 1957", establishing a national film development corporation, was introduced by Sheikh Mujibur Rahman, the founding father of Bangladesh. The bill was passed in the East Bengal Provincial Assembly, and Nazir Ahmed was appointed as the first creative director.

Initially, the East Pakistan Film Development Corporation allowed only specific directors to make films. Fateh Lohani directed the rural art film Asiya, the first film produced by the East Pakistan Film Development Corporation, with Nazir Ahmed supervising the production. Asiya received the President Award for best Bangla film in 1961. Other early films released by the East Pakistan Film Development Corporation include Akash Ar Mati (The Sky and The Earth), a song film directed by Fateh Lohani in 1959.

A. J. Kardar directed the Bengali-Urdu film The Day Shall Dawn in 1959, with Zahir Raihan working as the assistant director. The film was based on the 1936 Bengali novel Padma Nadir Majhi (The Boatman on The River Padma) by Bengali novelist Manik Bandopadhyay. It was an internationally acclaimed movie.  The film was submitted as the Pakistani entry for the Academy Award for Best Foreign Language Film at the 32nd Academy Awards, but was not accepted as a nominee. It was also entered into the 1st Moscow International Film Festival, where it won a Golden Medal.

The establishment of the East Pakistan Film Development Corporation led to the growth of the East Bengal film industry and gave rise to three prominent studios: the Popular Studio, Bari Studio, and Bengal Studio. Prominent directors Abdul Jabbar Khan, Fateh Lohani, Ehtesham, and Mohiuddin worked with these studios. Notable films from these directors include Matir Pahar (The Clay Hill) (1959) by Mohiuddin and E Desh Tomar Amar (1959) by Ehtesham. The East Pakistan Film Development Corporation's own films sometimes struggled to achieve financial success.

1960s 

During the late 1960s, 20-35 films were produced every year. Fateh Lohani's Asiya and Ehtesham's Rajdhanir Buke (In the heart of the capital) were both positively reviewed by critics. In addition to directing, Lohani also acted in a number of East Bengali films throughout the 1960s, including Tanha (1964), Agun Niye Khela (1967) and Julekha (1967). Other notable directors of the 1960s include Salahuddin, who made a number of social drama films like Je Nodi Morupothe (1961), and Khan Ataur Rahman, who directed Nawab Sirajuddaula (1967). Rahman was also an actor and a singer, and featured in Kokhono Asheni (Never Came) (1961), Kancher Deyal (Crystal Wall) (1963).

Zahir Raihan was a star director of East Bengali cinema in the 1960s, and directed films like Kokhono Asheni (Never Came) (1961), Shangam (1964) (The first Pakistani colour film), and Jibon Theke Neya. Jibon Theke Neya, a political satire based on the Bengali Language Movement under the rule of Pakistan, is considered a classic of Bangladeshi cinema.

Some notable actors from the 1960s include Rahman, Sumita Devi, Khan Ataur Rahman, Rawshan Jamil, Anwar Hossain, Anwara Begum, Golam Mustafa, Abdur Razzak, Kabori Sarwar, Shabana, Farida Akhter Bobita, Farooque, Shabnam, Shawkat Akbar, Rosy Samad, Baby Zaman, and Kohinoor Akhter Shuchanda. The most well-known Bangladeshi actor to date had been Abdur Razzak, who was deemed the Nayok Raaj Rajjak (King of Heroes) by his fans. He started his career as a side actor in 1965 and became a leading actor in 1967. Abdur Razzak and Kabori Sarwar was the most popular pair from 1967 to the 1970s.

After independence

1970s 
A total of 41 films were released in 1970, including Shorolipi by Nazrul Islam, Taka Ana Paay and the Jibon Theke Neya by Zahir Raihan.

Jibon Theke Neya, considered a milestone film in the history of Bengali cinema, was a political satire based on the Bengali Language Movement under the rule of Pakistan. It stars Shaukat Akbar, Anwar Hossain, Khan Ataur Rahman, Rawshan Jamil, Abdur Razzak, Kohinoor Akhter Shuchanda, Amjad Hossain and Rosy Samad. The film has been described as an example of "national cinema", using discrete local traditions to build a representation of the Bangladeshi national identity. Other significant works of 1970 were Mishor Kumari of Karigir, Tansen of Rafiqul Bari, Bindu Theke Britto of Rebeka, Binimoy of Subhash Dutta, Kothay Jeno Dekhechi of Nizamul Hoque.

Only 6 Bengali films and two Urdu films made in East Bengal were released in 1971 before the Bangladesh Liberation War. Some notable social drama films include Nacher Putul by Ashok Ghosh, Sritituku Thak by Alamgir Kumkum, and Shukh Dukkho by Khan Ataur Rahman.

Following the outbreak of the Bangladesh Liberation War, Raihan made the documentary Stop Genocide to draw attention to the plight of the people of East Bengal. It was one of the first internationally acclaimed films of Bangladesh.

In December 1971, the East Pakistan Film Development Corporation changed its name to the Bangladesh Film Development Corporation, which had the only major film studio and colour lab of the Bangladeshi film industry until the 2010s. Most Bangladeshi films were produced from this studio. Production quantity continued to increase after Bangladesh gained its independence; by the 1990s, over 90 films per year were released. At that time, the film department was under the leadership of Abdul Jabbar Khan. The Bangladeshi film industry was successful both critically and commercially through the first half of the 1990s.

Many Bangladeshi movies of the 1970s were about the war. The first full-length feature film of independent Bangladesh was Ora Egaro Jon released in 1972. The movie was directed by Chashi Nazrul Islam. Other filmmakers who made critically acclaimed war films in the 1970s include Alamgir Kabir, Chashi Nazrul Islam, and Subhash Dutta. Three of Kabir's feature films are featured in the "Top 10 Bangladeshi Films" critics' choice list by the British Film Institute. His films include Dhire Bohe Meghna (1973), Shurjo Konya (1976), Shimana Periye (1977), Rupali Shoykte (1979), Mohona (1982), Porinita (1984) and Mohanayok (1985). Other notable directors in the 1970s include Narayan Ghosh Mita, Abdullah al Mamun, Johirul Haque, and Amjad Hossain. Haque's Rongbaaj was one of the first commercial action films of Bangladesh.

After independence, one of the first international acclaimed film was A River Called Titas released in 1973, directed by prominent Indian Bengali director Ritwik Ghatak and starring Prabir Mitra in the lead role. Titash Ekti Nadir Naam topped the list of 10 best Bangladeshi films in the audience and critics' polls conducted by the British Film Institute in 2002. Some other notable films of 1970s include Joy Bangla (1972) of Fakrul Alom; Lalon Fokir (1972) of Syed Hasan Imam; Obhuj Mon (1972) of Kazi Jhohir; Shongram (1974) by Chashi Nazrul Islam, Arunodoyer Agnishakkhi (1972), Bashundhara (1977) by Subhash Dutta; Alor Michil (1974), Lathial (1975) by Narayan Ghosh Mita; Megher Onek Rong (1976) by Harunur Rashid; Golapi Ekhon Traine (1978) by Amjad Hossain; Sareng Bou (1978) by Abdullah al Mamun; Oshikkhito (1978) by Azizur Rahman; The Father (1979) by Kazi Hayat, and Surjo Dighal Bari (1979) by Sheikh Niamat Ali and Moshiuddin Shaker. Surjo Dighal Bari was a critically acclaimed movie and it re-introduced Bangladeshi films to the international audience. The movie was based on a novel of the same name by Abu Ishaque. In 1975, the government started a national film award, as well as a donation fund for creative films.

1980s 

The 1970s and 1980s were a golden era for Bangladeshi film industry commercially and critically. At this time, a lot of actors and actresses enjoyed popularity, including Abdur Razzak who was the most successful actor commercially during this period, as well as Kabori Sarwar, Shabana, Farida Akhter Bobita, Farooque, Shabnam, Kohinoor Akhter Shuchanda, Alamgir, Sohel Raana, Amol Bose, Bulbul Ahmed, Zafar Iqbal, Wasim, Ilias Kanchan, Jashim, Rozina, Parveen Sultana Diti, Champa and others.

In the 1980s most of the Bangladeshi commercial films were influenced in film-making, style and presentation by Indian movies, mostly Hindi movies from Maharashtra. But many of the films were original or adaptation from literary works. Some notable original and adapted films include, Chhutir Ghonta (1980) by Azizur Rahman; Emiler Goenda Bahini (1980) by Badal Rahman; Shokhi Tumi Kar (1980), Akhoni Shomoy (1980) by Abdullah Al Mamun; Lal Shobujer Pala (1980), Obichar (1985) by Syed Hasan Imam; Koshai (1980), Jonmo Theke Jolchi (1981), Bhat De (1984) by Amjad Hossain; Devdas (1982), Chandranath (1984), Shuvoda (1987) by Chashi Nazrul Islam; Smriti Tumi Bedona (1980) by Dilip Shom; Mohona (1982), Porinita (1986) by Alamgir Kabir; Boro Bhalo Lok Chhilo (1982) by Mohammad Mohiuddin; Puroshkar (1983) by C.B Zaman; Maan Shomman (1983) by A.J Mintu; Nazma (1983), Shokal-Shondha (1984), Fulshojja (1986) by Subhash Dutta; Rajbari (1984) by Kazi Hayat; Grihilokkhi (1984) by Kamal Ahmed; Dahan (1986) by Sheikh Niamat Ali; Shot Bhai (1985) by Abdur Razzak; Ramer Shumoti (1985) by Shahidul Amin; Rajlokkhi-Srikanto (1986) by Bulbul Ahmed; Harano Shur (1987) by Narayan Ghosh Mita; Dayi Ke (1987) by Aftab Khan Tulu; Tolpar (1988) by Kabir Anowar and Biraj Bou (1988) by Mohiuddin Faruk.

The parallel cinema movement was officially started from this decade, though there were many off-track movies were made of different genres from the 60s. But the 80s movies were strictly commercial influenced by Indian Hindi commercial films, so there was a necessity of a realism and naturalism cinema movement. The movement was started by Alamgir Kabir. From this movement some intellectual filmmakers came such as, Tanvir Mokammel, Tareque Masud and Morshedul Islam.

1990s 
In the 1990s most of the Bangladeshi movies were dominated by mainstream commercial movies. There were many successful films produced in this time.
In 1990s, definition of Bangla mainstream commercial movies had changed, because most of the movies were very much influenced by commercial Indian Hindi movies and most of them were direct copies from those Indian commercial Hindi films full with action, dance, song and jokes. In the 1990s some new directors and actors came to the industry. Intellectual Directors such as Tanvir Mokammel, Tareque Masud, Morshedul Islam, Humayun Ahmed, Nasiruddin Yousuff, Akhtaruzzaman and Mustafizur Rahman made some critically and internationally acclaimed films at that time. Two of Tanvir Mokammel's feature films are featured in the "Top 10 Bangladeshi Films" list by British Film Institute's critics choice.

Most successful male actors during this time was Alamgir, Jashim, Ilias Kanchan, Nayeem, Salman Shah and  Manna who gained success through the film Danga (1991) and continued sting of successful films until his death his in 2008, such as Shesh Khela, Khol Nayok, Dhar, Ammajan, Koshto, Bir Soinik, Kabuliwala (film) etc. Other notably successful actors are Riaz who was noted for his film Praner Cheye Priyo in 1997 and continued to star in commercially successful films in the 2000s, and Omar Sani (noted for Coolie in 1997) among others.

Among success female actors were Shabana, Champa, Dolly Johur, Suchorita, Shabnaz. Some notable films from this decade include Padma Nadir Majhi by Indian director Goutam Ghose, Padma Meghna Jamuna by Chashi Nazrul Islam, Pita Mata Sontan and Banglar Bodhu by A. J. Mintu, Aguner Poroshmoni and Srabon Megher Din by Humayun Ahmed, Desh Premik by Kazi Hayat, Anya Jibon by Sheikh Niamat Ali, Poka Makorer Ghor Bosoti by Akhtaruzzaman, Dukhai by Morshedul Islam, Hothat Brishti by Indian director Basu Chatterjee and Chitra Nodir Pare by Tanvir Mokammel.

21st century

2000s 

During the 2000s, most Bangladeshi films underperformed commercially and Bangladesh produced about 100 low-budget movies a year. Viewership of Bangladeshi films in general dropped, and the industry was criticized for producing low-quality films whose only appeal was that of cheap melodrama.

After a drastic decline in the 2000s, the Bangladeshi film industry tried to bounce back after 2006–07. With the help of the Bangladeshi Government and the emergence of big production companies, the Bangladeshi film industry started growing slowly.

Among the successful films that released in the 2000s are Ammajan, Premer Taj Mahal, Wrong Number, Shasti, Shyamol Chhaya, Hridoyer Kotha, Daruchini Dwip, Monpura, Priya Amar Priya, Koti Takar Kabin, Chacchu, Khairun Sundori, Amar Praner Swami, Pitar Ason, Tumi Swapno Tumi Shadhona, Mone Prane Acho Tumi, Amar Shopno Tumi, Bolbo Kotha Bashor Ghore, among others. Besides critically acclaimed films like Kittonkhola, Lalsalu, Hason Raja ,Matir Moyna, Bachelor, Joyjatra, Hajar Bachhor Dhore, Ghani and Chandragrohon were produced in this decade. Most of the successful films during this period starred Manna (until his death in 2008) followed by Shakib Khan, Riaz, and Ferdous Ahmed. Leading female actors included Moushumi, Shabnur, Popy and Champa.

2010s 

Since 2012, Bangladesh has developed several big production and distribution companies, such as Monsoon Films, Jaaz Multimedia and Tiger Media Limited and the films produced by them have been doing better business than others for their large budget and glamorous appearance. Four of the top ten highest grossing Bangladeshi films were released in the 2010s. In 2014 India's Reliance Entertainment Limited had expressed their interest in producing Bangladeshi films. However, the Bangladesh Film Corporation didn't respond due to the ban on Indian films in Bangladesh. Another notable film was released in the year 2010 named " Jaago " directed by one of the prominent and young director named Khijir Hayat Khan. And "Jaago" is the first sports-based film in Bangla Cinema. Top actors during this period included Shakib Khan, as well as Ananta Jalil, Arifin Shuvo, Bappy Chowdhury, Symon Sadik, Jayed Khan.

2020s
In 2020s, a new wave of cinema is going through Bangladeshi film industry. Started during Covid-19 pandemic, ott consumption increased largely in the country. New Bangladeshi platforms like Chorki and Binge became popular. Films like Poran, Hawa, Operation Sundarbans, Damal became box office hits. New wave directors include Abdullah Mohammed Saad, Mejbaur Rahman Sumon, Syed Ahmed Shawki, Ashfaque Nipun, Sanjoy Somadder, Tanim Noor, Robiul Alom Robi and many more.

International recognition of Bangladeshi cinema 

Internationally acclaimed Bangladeshi films include, Zahir Raihan's Stop Genocide (1971); Ritwik Ghatak's A river called Titas (1973); Sheikh Niamat Ali and Moshiuddin Shaker's Surja Dighal Bari (1979); Tanvir Mokammel's Hooliya (1984), Nadir Naam Modhumati (1995) Quiet Flows the River Chitra (1999), Lalsalu (2001) and Lalon (2004); Morshedul Islam's Agami (1984), Chaka (1993), Dipu Number Two (1996), Dukhai (1997), Duratta (2004) and Amar Bondhu Rashed (2011); Tareque Masud's The Inner Strength (1989), Song of Freedom (1995), Story of Freedom (1999) and The Clay Bird (2002); Humayun Ahmed's Aguner Poroshmoni (1994) and Shyamol Chhaya (2004); Abu Sayeed's kittonkhola (2000), Shankhonad (2004), Rupantor (2008); Enamul Karim Nirjhar's Aha! (2007); Golam Rabbany Biplob's On the Wings of Dreams (2007); Mostofa Sarwar Farooki's Bachelor (2003), Third Person Singular Number (2009), Television (2013) and No Bed of Roses; Tauquir Ahmed's Joyjatra (2004) and Oggyatonama (2016); Rubaiyat Hossain's Meherjaan (2011) and Under Construction (2016); Kamar Ahmad Simon's Shunte Ki Pao! (Are You Listening!) (2012); Zahidur Rahim Anjan's Meghmallar (2014); Aung Rakhine's  My Bicycle (2015);  Bijon Imtiaz's Matir Projar Deshe-Kingdom of Clay Subjects (2016), Amitabh Reza Chowdhury's Aynabaji (2016) etc. These films won many international acclaims introducing Bangladeshi films to a wide international audiences. The late Tareque Masud is regarded as one of Bangladesh's outstanding directors due to his numerous productions on historical and social issues. Masud was honored by FIPRESCI at the Cannes Film Festival in 2002 for his film The Clay Bird (2002).

Government support 
The government of Bangladesh played a huge role in the re-emergence of Bangladeshi films. The Bangladesh Film Development Corporation was established as an assistance hub for Bangladeshi cinema. The government also spends about $1 million annually for the development of Bangladeshi parallel cinema and art cinema. Bangladesh Awami League, the present government, spent more than $10 million in 2012 and 2014–15 for the modern technical supports in Bangladeshi cinema.

Film production and distribution house 

There are more than 100 production houses in the Bangladeshi film industry, but few have managed to be successful in the market. Such production houses and distribution houses have helped Bangladeshi movies to reach a national and international platform, releasing films and distributing them to audiences overseas. Some well-known production houses in the Bangladeshi cinema include, Impress Telefilm, Khona Talkies, SK Films, Monsoon Films, Jaaz Multimedia, Tiger Media Limited, The Abhi Pictures, Fatman Films, Bongo BD,

Important figures

Directors

Actors

Actresses

Films

Notable films

Classics 

 Sukumari-The good girl (1927–28)
 The Last Kiss (1931)
 The Face and the Mask (1956)
 The Day Shall Dawn (1959)
 The Sky and The Earth (1959)
 The Clay Hill (1959)
 Asiya (1960)
 Kokhono Asheni (1961)
 Shonar Kajol (1962)
 Kancher Deyal-The Glass Wall (1963)
 Shangam (1964)
 Bahana (1965)
 Behula (1966)
 Anowara (1967)
 Nawab Sirajuddaula (1967)
 Dui Bhai-Two Brothers (1968)
 Seven Brothers Champak (1968)
 Jibon Theke Neya (1970)
 Ora Egaro Jon (1972)
 A River Called Titas (1973)
 Quiet Flows the river Meghna (1973)
 Shimana Periye (1977)
 Sareng Bou (1978)
 Surjo Dighal Bari (1979)
 Chhutir Ghonta (Holiday Hours) (1980)
 Emiler Goenda Bahini (1980)
 Devdas (1982)
 Shuvoda (1986)
 Rajlokkhii Srikanto (1987)
 Shonkhonil Karagar (1992)
 Ekattorer Jishu (Jesus of '71) (1993)
 Aguner Poroshmoni (1994)
 Dipu Number Two (1996)
 Hangor Nodi Grenade (1997)
 Quiet Flows the River Chitra (1999)
 A Rainy Day of the Month Srabon (1999)
 Lalsalu (A Tree without roots) (2001)
 The Punishment (2004)
 Hajar Bachhor Dhore (2005)
 Shyamol Chhaya (The Green Shade) (2005)
 Shuva (2006)
 Meherjaan (2011)
 My Friend Rashed (2011)
 Shunte Ki Pao! (Are You Listening!) (2012)
 Live From Dhaka (2016)

Cult films 

 The Day Shall Dawn (1959)
 Behula (1966)
 Nawab Sirajuddaula (1967)
 Dui Bhai-Two Brothers (1968)
 Seven Brothers Champak (1968)
 Jibon Theke Neya (1970)
 11 Warriors (1972)
 Arunodoyer Agnishakkhi (1972)
 Quiet Flows the river Meghna (1973)
 Alor Michil (1974)
 Megher Onek Rong (1976)
 Shimana Periye (1977)
 Chhutir Ghonta (Holiday Hours) (1980)
 Emiler Goenda Bahini-Emil and the Detectives (1980)
 Devdas (1982)
 Boro Bhalo Lok Chhilo (1982)
 Hooliya (Wanted) (1984)
 The Gypsy Girl (1989)
 Nodir Naam Modhumoti (1990)
 Shonkhonil Karagar (1992)
 Ekattorer Jishu (Jesus of '71) (1993)
 The Boatman on The River Padma (1993)
 Aguner Poroshmoni (1994)
 Song of Freedom (1995)
 Dukhai (1997)
 Quiet Flows the River Chitra (1999)
 Story of Freedom (1999)
 Kittonkhola (2000)
 The Clay Bird (2002)
 Journey to Victory (2004)
 Shyamol Chhaya (The Green Shade) (2005)
 Homeland-The Inner Journey (2006)
 On the Wings of Dreams (2007)
 Shunte Ki Pao! (Are You Listening!) (2012)
 Live From Dhaka (2016)

Modern era films 

 Dui Duari (2000)
 Lalsalu (A Tree without roots) (2001)
 The Clay Bird (2002)
 Lalon (2004)
 Duratta (The Distance) (2004)
 Journey to Victory (2004)
 Shyamol Chhaya (The Green Shade) (2005)
 Homeland-The Inner Journey (2006)
 On the Wings of Dreams (2007)
 Aha! (2007)
 Monpura (2009)
 Third Person Singular Number (2009)
 Britter Baire (2009)
 Dark Resonance (2010)
 Jaago(2010)
 Meherjaan (2011)
 Quicksand (2012)
 Lal Tip (2012)
 Shunte Ki Pao! (Are You Listening!) (2012)
 Television (2013)
 Ant Story (2014)
 Faand: The Trap (2014)
 Agnee (2014)
 Taarkata (2014)
 Checkmate (2014)
 Desha: The Leader (2014)
 Glow of the Firefly (2014)
 Brihonnola (2014)
 Hitman (2014)
 U-turn (2015)
 Gangster Returns (2015)
 Live From Dhaka (2016)
 Under Construction (2016)
 Angaar (2016)
 Sweetheart (2016)
 Full Length Love Story II (2016)
 Musafir (2016)
 Ostitto (2016)
 Niyoti (2016)
 Samraat: The King Is Here (2016)
 Shikari (2016)
 Bossgiri (2016)
 Oggatonama (2016)
 Aynabaji (2016)
 Bhuban Majhi (2016)
 Nabab (2017)
 Dhaka Attack (2017)
 No Bed of Roses (2017)
 Debi (2018)
 Shopner Ghor (2018)
 Password (2019)
 Nolok (2019)
 Shapludu (2019)
 Iti, Tomari Dhaka (2019)
 No Dorai (2019)

Commercial successes 

 The Face and the Mask (1956)
 The Day Shall Dawn (1959)
 The Sky and The Earth (1959)
 The Clay Hill (1959)
 Behula (1966)
 Nawab Sirajuddaula (1967)
 Dui Bhai-Two Brothers (1968)
 Seven Brothers Champak (1968)
 Story of Life (1970)
 11 Warriors (1972)
 A River Called Titas (1973)
 Quiet Flows the river Meghna (1973)
 Shimana Periye (1977)
 Sareng Bou (1978)
 Surjo Dighal Bari (1979)
 Chhutir Ghonta (Holiday Hours) (1980)
 Emiler Goenda Bahini (1980)
 Devdas (1982)
 The Gypsy Girl (1989)
 Chakor(1992)
 Aguner Poroshmoni (1994)
 Dipu Number Two (1996)
 Coolie (1997)
 Shanto Keno Mastan (1998)
 Kukkhato Khuni (2000)
 Monpura (2009)
 Number One Shakib Khan (2010)
 Most Welcome (2012)
 PoraMon (2013)
 My Name Is Khan (2013)
 Nishwartha Bhalobasa (2013)
 Full Length Love Story (2013)
 The Kingdom (2014)
 Agnee (2014)
 Faand: The Trap (2014)
 Hero: The Superstar (2014)
 Most Welcome 2 (2014)
 Hitman (2014)
 Checkmate(2014)
 Romeo vs Juliet (2015)
 Chuye Dile Mon (2015)
 Love Marriage (2015)
 Full Length Love Story II (2016)
 Musafir (2016)
 Samraat: The King Is Here (2016)
 Shikari (2016)
 Mental (2016)
 Bossgiri (2016)
 Aynabaji (2016)
 Nabab (2017)
 Dhaka Attack (2017)
 Jannat (2018)
 Password (2019)
 Nolok (2019)

Major events

Festivals 
 Dhaka International Film Festival
 Bangladesh Short Film Forum
 International Short and Independent Film Festival
 International Children's Film Festival

Awards 
 Bachsas Film Awards – since 1972
 National Film Awards – since 1975
 Meril Prothom Alo Awards – since 1998
 Babisas Award – since 2004
 Ifad Film Club Award – since 2012
 Lux Channel I Performance Award
 Green Bangla Binodon Bichitra Performance Award

Film education 
 Bangladesh Film And Television Institute
 International Academy of Film and Media (IAFM), partner of the event International Student Award organised by UniFrance
 Department of Film and Television (Under Jagannath University)
 Television and Film Studies (Under University of Dhaka)
 Graphics Design & Multimedia, BA(Hons.) (Shanto-Mariam University of Creative Technology (SMUCT)
 Film and Media Studies, BA(Hons.), Film and Media Studies, MA (Under Stamford University Bangladesh)
 Multimedia & Creative Technology (Under Daffodil International University)
 Department of Film, Television and Digital Media (FTDM) (Under Green University of Bangladesh)
 Department of Media and Communication (Under Independent University, Bangladesh)
 Bangladesh Film Institute (Past) and Bangladesh Film Institute (Present)
 Moviyana Film Society
 Bangladesh Film and Television Academy
 Pathshala Cinema Department
 Bangladesh Film School

See also 
 List of Bangladeshi films
 List of highest grossing Bangladeshi films
 Independent films of Bangladesh
 Bangladesh National Film Award for Best Film
 List of Bangladeshi submissions for the Academy Award for Best Foreign Language Film
 History of Cinema
 Cinema of the world
 Cinema of West Bengal

References

External links 
 Database of Bangladeshi Films – IMDb

 
Films
Bangladesh
Film production districts